2006 has thus far been an important year for Swiss music, with the first few months of the year seeing a very steady pattern at the top end of the Swiss singles and album charts.

Chart summary 
The first Swiss Top 100 Singles Chart number one of 2006 was Madonna's "Hung Up", the first single releases from her Confessions on a Dance Floor album (which itself had been number one in November 2005, and started the year at number two). "Hung Up" had been number since November 20, 2005 already and started the year with its seventh week at number one. The first album chart number one was Robbie Williams' Intensive Care, again a continuation from the previous year.

January 8 would bring the first new number one of 2006, in "Big City Life" by Mattafix. "Big City Life" had already been on the chart since October, ending 2005 at number two in the chart. Mattafix and Robbie Williams would see out January topping their respective charts. Meanwhile, the confirmed Swiss Eurovision Song Contest 2006 entrant Six4one announced during January that their song for the contest will be "If We All Give A Little", although no extra information about the song was given at the time.

February 5 seen the first new album chart number one of the year, with James Blunt's Back To Bedlam album climbing back to the top, having been there for four weeks the previous year. Having been on the chart since June 19, Back To Bedlam has become one of the 200 most successful albums of all-time in Switzerland.

On February 12 Mattafix would finally fall off the top of the singles chart, with Eros Ramazzotti and Anastacia's duet "I Belong To You (Il Ritmo Della Passione)" taking over, having entered at No. 2 a week earlier. The duet is the third Swiss singles number one for both Ramazzotti and Anastacia. As of the chart week ending February 26, Ramazzotti and Anastacia still lie at number one in the singles chart, and James Blunt lies number one in the album chart (with his second album release, the live compilation Chasing Time: The Bedlam Sessions, at number two).

Despite the consistency at the top of the chart thus far in 2006, the Swiss singles chart has seen a lot of popular acts pass through it. Normally in the first two months of the year the chart would be mostly quiet, but the top ten has been fairly active, with acts including US5, 50 Cent, Ch!pz and Mary J. Blige entering toward the higher end of the chart this year.

Swiss charts

See also 
 2006 in music
 2006 in British music
 2006 in Irish music
 2006 in Norwegian music
 2006 in South Korean music
 2006 in country music
 2006 in classical music
 2006 in heavy metal music
 2006 in hip hop music
 2006 in jazz
 2006 in Latin music
 Six4one

References 
 Hitparade Chart Archive

External links 
 Swiss Charts official website (in English)
 Swiss Charts official website (in German)

Swiss music
Swiss music
Music